Powell is a city in Park County, Wyoming, United States. The population was 6,314 at the 2010 census. Powell is an All-America City and home to Northwest College.

History
Powell was incorporated in 1909.  Powell was named for John Wesley Powell, U.S. soldier, geologist and explorer. Powell post office was established January 23, 1908.

In 2013, the area was the subject of a piece of national legislation.  The Powell Shooting Range Land Conveyance Act (S. 130; 113th Congress), which was passed by both the United States Senate and the United States House of Representatives, would transfer a piece of land from the Bureau of Land Management to the Powell Recreation District for continued use as a shooting range.

Geography

Climate

According to the Köppen Climate Classification system, Powell has a cold desert climate, abbreviated "BWk" on climate maps.

Demographics

2010 census
As of the census of 2010, there were 6,314 people, 2,463 households, and 1,449 families living in the city. The racial makeup of the city was 93.7% White, 0.4% African American, 0.6% Native American, 1.2% Asian, 2.4% from other races, and 1.7% from two or more races. Hispanic or Latino of any race were 9.4% of the population.

There were 2,463 households, of which 28.4% had children under the age of 18 living with them, 45.5% were married couples living together, 9.4% had a female householder with no husband present, 3.9% had a male householder with no wife present, and 41.2% were non-families. 33.5% of all households were made up of individuals, and 13.7% had someone living alone who was 65 years of age or older. The average household size was 2.27 and the average family size was 2.93.

The median age in the city was 31.9 years. 21.2% of residents were under the age of 18; 19% were between the ages of 18 and 24; 22.8% were from 25 to 44; 20.3% were from 45 to 64; and 16.6% were 65 years of age or older. The gender makeup of the city was 48.5% male and 51.5% female.

2000 census
As of the census of 2000, there were 5,373 people, 2,083 households, and 1,272 families living in the city. The population density was 1,442.3 people per square mile (556.2/km2). There were 2,249 housing units at an average density of 603.7 per square mile (232.8/km2). The racial makeup of the city was 95.44% White, 0.13% African American, 0.47% Native American, 0.39% Asian, 0.04% Pacific Islander, 2.53% from other races, and 1.01% from two or more races. Hispanic or Latino of any race were 6.81% of the population.

There were 2,083 households, out of which 26.8% had children under the age of 18 living with them, 49.1% were married couples living together, 9.1% had a female householder with no husband present, and 38.9% were non-families. 31.4% of all households were made up of individuals, and 14.5% had someone living alone who was 65 years of age or older. The average household size was 2.28 and the average family size was 2.89.

In the city, the population was spread out, with 21.0% under the age of 18, 18.6% from 18 to 24, 22.4% from 25 to 44, 19.5% from 45 to 64, and 18.4% who were 65 years of age or older. The median age was 35 years. For every 100 females, there were 85.4 males. For every 100 females age 18 and over, there were 83.5 males.

The median income for a household in the city was $27,364, and the median income for a family was $34,877. Males had a median income of $36,175 versus $21,000 for females. The per capita income for the city was $14,518. About 13.5% of families and 20.3% of the population were below the poverty line, including 24.9% of those under age 18 and 4.8% of those age 65 or over.

Economy
Powell was originally established as a cattle ranching community. Oil reserves were found in the late-19th century, prompting the CB&Q Railroad (later BNSF), to extend a line into Powell. In the early 20th century, the Homestead Acts and the Shoshone Project contributed greatly to agricultural development in the Bighorn Basin. Mineral extraction and agriculture are still the key industries of Powell, with sugar beets, barley, and pinto beans being the most commonly grown cash crops. Beef production remains an important facet of the Powell economy, as well.
When the local department store in Powell closed, the community raised $400,000 and established the Powell Mercantile, a community-owned store.

Government
Powell uses a city council with six councilmembers. As of February 2020, the current mayor of Powell is John Wetzel and the current city clerk is Tiffany Brando.

Education
Powell has a public library, a branch of the Park County Library System.

Public K–12 education is administered by Park County School District No. 1, and includes 4 K–5 elementary schools (one of which is located in Clark, WY), Powell Middle School, Powell High School, and the Shoshone Learning Center, an alternative high school.
Northwest College, a public two-year residential college, is located in the Northern portion of Powell. Several 4-year degrees are available at Northwest through the University of Wyoming's extended campus.

Media

Newspapers
The Powell Tribune is the local twice-weekly paper, founded in 1909. The Cody Enterprise and Billings Gazette are also available in Powell.

AM radio
 KZMQ (AM) 1140 country
 KPOW 1260 country
 KODI 1400 news/talk

FM radio
 KFGR 88.1 Christian
 KUWP 90.1 Wyoming Public Radio and NPR, University of Wyoming 
 KTAG 97.9 adult contemporary
 KROW 101.1 active rock
 KZMQ-FM 100.3 country
 KBEN-FM 103.3 classic country
 KCGL 104.1 classic rock
 KWHO 107.1 80s, 90s & current

Television
Four television stations are available in Powell: KTVQ (CBS) and KULR (NBC) from Billings, KTWO (ABC) of Casper and PBS station K19LM-D, a local translator for KCWC-DT in Lander.

Notable people
 Chris Cooley (born 1982), American football player
 Darren Dalton (born 1965), film actor (The Outsiders)
 W. Edwards Deming (1900–1993), worked to reconstruct the Japanese economy after World War II
 Dennis Havig (born 1949), American football player

References

External links

 Powell Valley Chamber of Commerce Website
 Park County Archives

 
Cities in Park County, Wyoming
Cities in Wyoming